Marion Reichelt (née Weser; born 23 December 1962) is a German female former track and field athlete who competed in the long jump and heptathlon for East Germany. She was a heptathlon silver medallist at the European Cup Combined Events in 1987 and set a personal best score of 6442 points, ranking seventh on the world lists for that season. She placed sixth at the 1987 World Championships in Athletics in her only global senior performance.

She was listed among leaked Stasi documents, published by Brigitte Berendonk, as having been subject to the East German state doping programme.

International competitions

References

External links

Living people
1962 births
East German female long jumpers
East German heptathletes
German female long jumpers
German heptathletes
World Athletics Championships athletes for East Germany
Doping cases in athletics
East German sportspeople in doping cases